Cheontae is the Korean descendant of the Chinese Buddhist school Tiantai.  Tiantai was introduced to Korea a couple of times during earlier periods, but was not firmly established until the time of  Uicheon (1055-1101) who established Cheontae in Goryeo as an independent school.

Due to Uicheon's influence, it came to be a major force in the world of Goryeo Buddhism. After he returned from Song China in 1086, Uicheon sought to ease conflict between the doctrinal Gyo schools and Seon schools, believing that the Cheontae doctrine would be effective to this end.  Cheontae doctrine holds the Lotus Sutra as the peak of the Buddha's teachings, and postulates the following:

 All things are empty and without essential reality.
 All things have a provisional reality.
 All things are both absolutely unreal and provisionally real at once.

In accordance with the Cheontae doctrine, all experiences in the sensory world are in fact expressions of Buddhist law (Dharma), and therefore contain the key to enlightenment. This explains the extravagant altars and the colorful dynamism found at Seon temples using Dancheong coloring, differing from the austere and monochromatic aesthetic of the Zen school, intellectually predominant in Japan from the Kamakura period onwards.

Cheontae as a school has been largely absorbed into the Jogye Seon tradition, but an independent Cheontae school has been revived and has an estimated 2 million adherents. The school's headquarters are at Guinsa in Chungcheongbuk-do, near Danyang. The school also funds and operates the Buddhist university, Geumgang University.

See also
Zhiyi
Uicheon
Tiantai Buddhism
Korean Buddhism
Guinsa
Ryongtongsa
Geumgang University

References

External links
Cheontae (in Korean)
A. Charles Muller (trans): "Outline of the Tiantai Fourfold Teachings", compiled by the Goryeo Śramaṇa Chegwan.

 
Buddhism in Korea